HD 169830 c is an extrasolar planet, most likely a gas giant, with a minimum mass three and a half times that of Jupiter. Its orbit is eccentric, with a period (year) of 1830 days. In 2022, the true mass and inclination of HD 169830 c were measured via astrometry.

See also 
 HD 169830 b

References

Sagittarius (constellation)
Giant planets
Exoplanets discovered in 2003
Exoplanets detected by radial velocity
Exoplanets detected by astrometry